Seth Brown may refer to:

Seth W. Brown (1841–1923), U.S. Representative from Ohio
Seth Brown (baseball) (born 1992), American baseball player